Zail may refer to:
Zail - a revenue unit in British raj headed by the Zaildar
Zail Singh, president of India
Zail, Iran
Zail as a baby name refers to Officer of a province